The 1971 Women's European Volleyball Championship was the eighth edition of the event, organised by Europe's governing volleyball body, the Confédération Européenne de Volleyball. It was hosted in several cities in Italy from 23 September to 1 October 1971, with the final round held in Reggio Emilia.

Participating teams

Format
The tournament was played in two different stages. In the first stage, the eighteen participants were divided into six groups of three teams each. In the second stage, three groups were formed, one containing the six winners from first stage groups to contest the tournament title. A second group was formed by the six runners-up from first stage groups which played for position places from 7th to 12th. The third group was formed by the six teams which finished last from first stage groups, which played for positions places from 13th to 18th. All groups in both stages played a single round-robin format.

Pools composition

Venues

Preliminary round

Pool A
venue location: Gorizia, Italy

|}

|}

Pool B
venue location: Gorizia, Italy

|}

|}

Pool C
venue location: Reggio Emilia, Italy

|}

|}

Pool D
venue location: Reggio Emilia, Italy

|}

|}

Pool E
venue location: Imola, Italy

|}

|}

Pool F
venue location: Modena, Italy

|}

|}

Final round
venue location: Reggio Emilia, Italy

13th–18th pool

|}

|}

7th–12th pool

|}

|}

Final pool

|}

|}

Final ranking

References
 Confédération Européenne de Volleyball (CEV)

External links
 Results at todor66.com

European Championships
Volleyball European Championship
European Championship,1971
1971
September 1971 sports events in Europe
October 1971 sports events in Europe
Women's European Volleyball Championship,1971
European Championship,1971